Oldham Mumps (L&NWR) railway station opened on 5 July 1856 as the terminus of the Oldham branch from , the station served the Mumps area of Oldham. The station was probably only known as Oldham during its brief period of existence, the suffixes Mumps and L&NWR may have been added later to provide clarity between the various stations in Oldham. Hooper (1991) states the station was a temporary affair called Victoria. Several sources claim the station was only ever to be temporary.

The station location is not precisely known, it has been described as being:
 "...by a Junction with the Mumps Extension of the Lancashire and Yorkshire Railway at or near ''Mumps Mill." (Italics and capitalisation in original).
 "...presumably adjacent to the LYR station."
 "...with the Oldham Branch of the London and North Western Railway, at or near their Oldham station, at a place called Mumps,..."
 "...their existing terminus at Oldham Mumps..."
 "...this branch terminated at a station adjacent to the L&Y at Oldham Mumps."
 "...adjacent to the L&Y's Mumps station."

Hooper (1991) states that "there was a junction with the L&Y and a one road engine shed was erected for the engine  that would work the branch, with a turntable completeing the facilities".



References

Notes

Citations

Bibliography

 
 
 
 

 
 

Disused railway stations in the Metropolitan Borough of Oldham
Former London and North Western Railway stations
Railway stations in Great Britain opened in 1856
Railway stations in Great Britain closed in 1862